Ján Záhončík (born 23 April 1965) is a Slovak racewalker. He competed in the men's 20 kilometres walk at the 1992 Summer Olympics.

References

1965 births
Living people
Athletes (track and field) at the 1992 Summer Olympics
Slovak male racewalkers
Olympic athletes of Czechoslovakia
Sportspeople from Skalica